Lubomirski Palace is the name of several palaces of the Lubomirski family:

 Lubomirski Palace, Białystok :pl:Pałac Rüdigerów w Białymstoku
 Lubomirski Palace, Warsaw :pl:Pałac Lubomirskich w Warszawie
 Presidential Palace, Warsaw
 Szustr House :pl:Pałac Szustra
 Lubomirski Palace, Kraków :pl:Pałac Lubomirskich w Krakowie
 Lubomirski Palace, Lublin :pl:Pałac Lubomirskich w Lublinie
 Lubomirski Palace, Opole Lubelskie
 Lubomirski Palace, Przemyśl :pl:Pałac Lubomirskich w Przemyślu
 Summer Palace, Rzeszów :pl:Letni Pałac Lubomirskich w Rzeszowie

 Lubomirski Palace, Lviv
 Lubomirski Palace in Rivne
 Dubno Castle

Residential castles 
 Łańcut Castle
 Nowy Wiśnicz Castle
 Rzeszów Castle